Moussa Daweye (born 25 April 1958) is a Nigerien middle-distance runner. He competed in the men's 800 metres at the 1984 Summer Olympics.

References

1958 births
Living people
Athletes (track and field) at the 1984 Summer Olympics
Nigerien male middle-distance runners
Olympic athletes of Niger
Place of birth missing (living people)